Sharon Labchuk (born November 25, 1952 in Trenton, Ontario) is an environmental activist and political organizer for the Green Party of Canada (GPC). She was also the first leader of the Green Party of Prince Edward Island.

Career
Labchuk founded the Green Party of Prince Edward Island in 2004. Labchuk is national director of organizing for the GPC. She resigned the leadership of the Green Party of PEI on July 12, 2012.

Election results
In the 2006 federal election Labchuk was the GPC candidate in Malpeque, placing 4th with 901 votes or 4.65%.

She was defeated in the district of Rustico-Emerald during the 2007 Prince Edward Island general election running for the Green Party. Labchuk took 6% of the vote, finishing in third place.

In 2011, Labchuk stood against the provincial Minister of Environment, Energy and Forestry, in the Charlottetown-Victoria Park riding.

2011 general election

|}

2007 general election

|}

Federal

Personal life
Labchuk lives in Millvale, Queens County, in a solar-powered house. She grows her own fruit and vegetables.

See also
 List of Green party leaders in Canada

References

External links
 CTV bio
 Green Party works on provincial status

Leaders of the Green Party of Prince Edward Island
Green Party of Canada candidates in the 2004 Canadian federal election
Living people
1952 births
People from Quinte West
Female Canadian political party leaders
Women in Prince Edward Island politics
Prince Edward Island candidates for Member of Parliament
21st-century Canadian women politicians